Stelis amaliae is a species of orchid plant native to Colombia.

References 

amaliae
Flora of Colombia